William E. Henry (1918–1994) was an American psychologist who worked on projective personality assessment, particularly in relation to executive leadership. He received the Bruno Klopfer Award in 1973.

References 

1918 births
1994 deaths
20th-century American psychologists